The D.I.C.E. Award for Game of the Year is an award presented annually by the Academy of Interactive Arts & Sciences during the academy's annual D.I.C.E. Awards. It is given in honor of "the single game, without regard to system or delivery mechanism, voted by the membership of the Academy of Interactive Arts & Sciences that best utilizes the chosen medium to entertain users".

The most recent winner of the award is Elden Ring developed by From Software and published by Bandai Namco Entertainment.

History

Category name changes
The 1st Interactive Achievement Award ceremony was held on May 28, 1998, with the licensed adaptation of GoldenEye007, that was developed by Rare and published by Nintendo, receiving the first award. The award was originally known as Interactive Title of the Year for the 1998 ceremony. It would be renamed Game of the Year. Between 2006 and 2009 the awarded was presented as the Overall Game of the Year.

Indie Games

The first indie that was nominated for Game of the Year was Angry Birds HD. Journey would be the first indie game winner. The only other two indie games that have won, so far, are Untitled Goose Game and Hades. Since 2016, there has been at least one indie game nominee for Game of the Year:
2016: Ori and the Blind Forest
2017: Inside
2018: Cuphead
2019: Into the Breach, Return of the Obra Dinn
2020: Disco Elysium, Outer Wilds, Untitled Goose Game
2021: Hades
2022: Inscryption
2023: Stray, Vampire Survivors
2019, 2020 and 2023 are the only years so far that have had more than one indie game nominee. With 2020 being the first year of an indie game majority of the nominees.

Genres
The most frequently nominated and winning genres for Game of the Year have been action, adventure, and role-playing. No strategy game has ever won the award, but there have been fourteen strategy games have been nominated: Age of Empires, Sid Meier's Alpha Centauri, Age of Empires II: The Age of Kings, Age of Empires II: The Conquerors, Command & Conquer: Red Alert 2, Sacrifice Command & Conquer: Generals, Rise of Nations, XCOM: Enemy Unknown, Hearthstone, Into the Breach, and Inscryption. The Sims is the only simulation game to have won. Only five others have been nominated: MechWarrior 4: Vengeance, RollerCoaster Tycoon: Loopy Landscapes, Animal Crossing, Nintendogs, and Animal Crossing: New Horizons. Four rhythm games have been nominated: PaRappa the Rapper, Guitar Hero, Guitar Hero II, and Rock Band. The only fighting games that have been nominated are Soulcalibur, Tekken Tag Tournament, and WWF No Mercy. The 2001 Awards had six sports game nominees: FIFA 2001, Links 2001, Madden NFL 2001, SSX, Tony Hawk's Pro Skater 2, and Virtua Tennis. SSX 3 and Wii Sports are the only sports game nominated after 2001. Only three expansion packs have ever been nominated Age of Empires II: The Conquerors, EverQuest: The Ruins of Kunark and RollerCoaster Tycoon: Loopy Landscapes.

Platforms
Nearly every Game of the Year nominee has either been released for a home video game console or for personal computer. Pokémon Yellow, Nintendogs, and The Legend of Zelda: A Link Between Worlds are the only nominees that were released for handheld game consoles. There have been four nominees that were released for mobile devices at the time of their nomination: Angry Birds HD, The Walking Dead, Hearthstone, and Pokémon Go. Journey, Borderlands 2, XCOM: Enemy Unknown, Inside, and Into the Breach would eventually be released for mobile devices, but they were not at the time of their nomination.

Other Game of the Year Awards
Usually the winner for Game of the Year also wins the award for their respective genre/platform. The only exceptions have been The Sims, Battlefield 1942, and It Takes Two, the first two were not even nominated for their respective genre related category. The have been five winners for Family Game of the Year that have been nominated: Guitar Hero, Guitar Hero II, Rock Band, LittleBigPlanet, and Animal Crossing: New Horizons, with LittleBigPlanet being the only winner for Game of the Year as well. Angry Birds HD and Journey were the only winners for Casual Game of the Year to have been nominated, the latter of which won both awards.

List of Winners and nominees

1990s

2000s

2010s

2020s

Multiple nominations and wins
Out of all the nominees and winners Nintendo has developed 13 nominees, having the most Game of the Year nominees. Nintendo is also tied with Blizzard Entertainment, Infinity Ward, Santa Monica Studio, Naughty Dog, BioWare, and Bethesda Game Studio for each developing 2 Game of the Year winners, being the most of any developer so far. Sony has published the most game of the year nominees and winners. Sony is also the only publisher to have back-to-back wins for Game of the Year. The first in for LittleBigPlanet in 2008 and Uncharted 2: Among Thieves in 2009, and the second time for Journey in 2012 and The Last of Us in 2013. Rockstar Games currently published the most Game of the Year nominees without having a single winner so far. Insomniac Games is the leading developer with the most nominations without a single win.

Franchises
There have several franchises that have been nominated multiple times for Game of the Year. So far the most nominated franchise so far is The Legend of Zelda franchise, with seven nominations. Call of Duty, The Legend of Zelda, and 
God of War are the only franchises to have won Game of the Year twice. Grand Theft Auto has been the most nominated without winning a single award. Final Fantasy VII Remake is the first and only remake that has been nominated so far. Let alone a remake of a previous nominee.

Notes

References

 
Awards established in 1998
Awards for best video game